Kyaa Kool Hain Hum is a 2005 Indian Hindi-language adult comedy film directed by Sangeeth Sivan and produced by Ekta Kapoor. The film stars Tusshar Kapoor and Ritesh Deshmukh. It is the first installment of Kyaa Kool Hain Hum series and was a surprise commercial success despite mixed reviews.

Plot
Rahul is sincere and hardworking whilst Karan Pandey is just the opposite. Both are best friends and cool wannabes. When they are evicted from their flat, they both enter their flat from the back of the apartment and live secretly. They try to find girlfriends and secretly enter a college reunion party from where they are thrown out after being caught. Karan tricks a girl into roaming with him by stealing a car but gets caught by the police and gets beaten up. He lies to Rahul that he had fun with the girl. While running from tailor Popat, Rahul is advised by a baba that his true love will have a mole on her chest.

When the city is rocked with a series of rape and killings, the police with psychiatrist/psychologist Dr. Screwvala is in search of this dreaded Serial Killer. Due to some misunderstanding, Rahul becomes the prime suspect. Meanwhile, Karan gets beaten up by violent lady inspector and again lies about the incident to Rahul. Things take a funny turn when the job of nabbing Rahul is entrusted to Urmila Martodkar . Urmila and Doctor again misinterpret Rahul's actions. Urmila is taken to a salon and kept gagged with tape on her mouth while the doctor instructs how she has to be disguised, while she moans through the tape on her mouth. She meets Rahul in a complete makeover as a hot woman. Rahul falls in love with her and invites her to live in his flat secretly. She tries to seduce him in sexy clothes to reveal his true nature and she loves him back, not remembering she is on a police force mission. By this time, Karan falls in love with D.K. i.e., his boss's ex Kiran who is actually the brother of Rekha, a psychologist and Karan's ex-college mate.

After a roller coaster ride of mistaken identities and comedy of errors, the film reaches its peak when Karan is about to wed Kiran at the temple, but he is not aware that she is a transvestite, but Rekha and D.K. reach on time, where D.K. takes Kiran away and Rekha reveals that it was she who used to call and write letters to him on the name of Kiran, Karan realises his true love and reunites with her. The police are on the verge of arresting Rahul as the rapist, when the true rapist reveals himself, and turns out to be Uma Shankar Tripathi and is arrested by police. Rahul and Urmila reunite and the film ends.

Cast
 Tusshar Kapoor as Rahul / Sanju
 Riteish Deshmukh as Karan Pandey / Guddu / D.K. Bose
 Isha Koppikar as Sub Inspector Urmila Martodkar
 Neha Dhupia as Rekha
 Rajendranath Zutshi as D.K. Bose
 Anupam Kher as Dr. S. Screwvala
 Shoma Anand as Parvati
 Bobby Darling as Kiran
 Sushmita Mukherjee as Hira Hingorani
 Anil Nagrath as Flat owner
 Dinesh Hingoo as Flat buyer
 Vijay Patkar as Inspector Havaldar 
 Avtar Gill as Police Commissioner
 Razzak Khan as Popat (Laundry wala)
 Rana Jung Bahadur as Watchman
 Rajpal Yadav as Uma Shankar Tripathi / Rapist (Cameo appearance)
 Sophiya Chaudhary as Host of MTV Style Night (Special appearance)
 Johnny Lever as the Narrator
 Jay Sean in a Special Appearance in the song 'Dil Mera'
 Juggy D in a Special Appearance in the song 'Dil Mera'
 Veronica Mehta in a Special Appearance in the song 'Dil Mera'
 Rishi Rich in a Special Appearance in the song 'Dil Mera'

Soundtrack
The songs featured in the movie were composed by Anu Malik. Drummer Franco Vaz composed the background score of the movie.

Critical response
Taran Adarsh of IndiaFM gave the film 3 stars out of 5, writing ″On the whole, KYAA KOOL HAI HUM is a refreshing, fun-filled entertainer targeted at the youth mainly. At the box-office, the film should sail safe on the basis of the youth brigade. Its business at multiplexes during the weekends mainly will be heartening. Has the potential to grow with a good word of mouth!″

Conversely, Raja Sen of Rediff.com called the film ″Lukewarm″, writing ″Kya Kool Hai Hum starts well, sags in the middle, and ends on a surprisingly spry high—which would be acceptable enough, if only the flabby middle wasn't two hours and 40 minutes long.″

Sequels
Sequels named Kyaa Super Kool Hain Hum and Kyaa Kool Hain Hum 3 were released in July 2012 and January 2016 respectively. Deshmukh and Kapoor play the lead roles, while new additions include Sarah-Jane Dias and Neha Sharma. In Kya Kool Hain Hum 3 had Tusshar Kapoor and Aftab Shivdasani who replaced Ritesh Deshmukh in third installment.

References

External links 
 

2005 films
2000s Hindi-language films
2000s buddy comedy films
2000s sex comedy films
2005 black comedy films
Cross-dressing in Indian films
Films scored by Rishi Rich
Films scored by Anu Malik
Indian buddy comedy films
Indian sex comedy films
Indian black comedy films
Transgender-related films
Balaji Motion Pictures films
Indian LGBT-related films
2005 LGBT-related films
Films directed by Sangeeth Sivan
2005 comedy films